František Patočka (22 October 1904, Turnov – 14 March 1985, Prague) was a Czechoslovak microbiologist and serologist. He established the study of virology in Czechoslovakia.

Patočka studied medicine (specialised in microbiology) at the Charles University in Prague (graduated in 1928). In 1936 he became head of the Czech Bacteriological Institute (after Ivan Honl). At the end of World War II, together with epidemiologist Karel Raška, he was personally leading measures to stop the spread of epidemic typhus in the Terezín concentration camp. Together they wrote a report describing the appalling conditions and mistreatment of German civilians incarcerated in the Small Fortress after the war ended. During the 1960s he worked as an expert for the WHO in India and Zaire.

His brother Jan Patočka was a well-known Czechoslovak philosopher.

References

External links
 Biography (in Czech)
 List of scientific works (in Czech)

1904 births
1985 deaths
People from Turnov
People from the Kingdom of Bohemia
Serologists
Czechoslovak microbiologists
Czechoslovak epidemiologists
Charles University alumni
Academic staff of Charles University
Czechoslovak physicians
World Health Organization officials